Harry C. Van Norman (May 16, 1874 – October 11, 1929) was a member of the Illinois House of Representatives for the 2nd district from 1924 to 1927 and alderman of Chicago's 27th ward from 1927 until his death after a long illness in 1929. In both capacities he represented a significant portion of Chicago's Near West Side where he lived. A Democrat, he served alongside fellow Democrat Frank Ryan and Republican Peter S. Krump in the House, and had previously run unsuccessfully for the House in 1922. After his death he was succeeded by Democrat Jeremiah P. Leahy in the Chicago City Council in April 1930. Van Norman was born in Sauk Centre, Minnesota and moved to Chicago. He was involved with the furniture business and with real estate.

See also
List of Chicago aldermen since 1923

References

External links

Chicago City Council members
1874 births
1929 deaths
People from Sauk Centre, Minnesota
Businesspeople from Chicago
Democratic Party members of the Illinois House of Representatives